Zein Al Abdine Ghassan Farran (born 21 July 1999) is a Lebanese footballer who plays as a forward for  club Shabab Sahel, on loan from Ahed, and the Lebanon national team.

Club career
Farran began his career at Islah Borj Shmali, signing on 2 August 2017. On 15 August 2020, he joined Lebanese Premier League side Bourj. Farran moved to Ahed on 7 May 2021 on a free transfer, and was loaned out to Shabab Sahel for one year on 28 June 2022. By November, Farran had scored five goals and assisted four in the 2022–23 Lebanese Premier League.

International career
Farran represented Lebanon internationally at under-23 level. He made his senior debut for the Lebanon national team on 19 November 2022, as a substitute in a 2–0 friendly defeat to Kuwait in Dubai, United Arab Emirates.

Style of play 
Farran was noted as one of Lebanon's top prospects in his youth.

Career statistics

International

Honours
Ahed
 Lebanese Elite Cup runner-up: 2021

References

External links

 
 
 

1999 births
Living people
People from Tyre, Lebanon
Lebanese footballers
Association football forwards
Islah Borj Al Shmali Club players
Bourj FC players
Al Ahed FC players
Shabab Al Sahel FC players
Lebanese Second Division players
Lebanese Premier League players
Lebanon youth international footballers
Lebanon international footballers